Evan Neal (born September 19, 2000) is an American football offensive tackle for the New York Giants of the National Football League (NFL). He played college football at Alabama and was selected seventh overall by the Giants in the 2022 NFL Draft.

Early years
Neal was born on September 19, 2000, in Okeechobee, Florida. He originally attended Okeechobee High School before transferring to IMG Academy in Bradenton, Florida. He played in the 2019 Under Armour All-America Game. A five-star recruit, Neal committed to play college football at the University of Alabama.

College career
Neal started all 13 games at left guard during his freshman year in 2019 before moving to right tackle in 2020. He was a starting member of the team that won the 2021 College Football Playoff National Championship. Following the 2021 season, Neal announced that he would forgo his senior year and enter the 2022 NFL Draft.

Professional career

Neal was drafted seventh overall by the New York Giants in the 2022 NFL Draft. In Week 8 against the Jacksonville Jaguars Neal injured his knee. He returned in Week 13. He played in and started 13 regular season games and both of the Giants' playoff games as a rookie.

Personal life
Neal's father, Eddie, played linebacker at Tulane while three uncles — Frankie Neal, Cleveland Gary, and Jimmie Jones — played in the NFL.

References

External links
 
 New York Giants bio
 Alabama Crimson Tide bio

2000 births
Living people
People from Okeechobee, Florida
Players of American football from Florida
American football offensive tackles
American football offensive guards
Alabama Crimson Tide football players
IMG Academy alumni
All-American college football players
New York Giants players